Bear Creek is a stream in Clark, Lewis, and Scotland counties in the U.S. state of Missouri. It is a tributary of the Fabius River.

Bear Creek was named due to the fact that it was a hunting ground of bears by pioneers.

See also
List of rivers of Missouri

References

Rivers of Clark County, Missouri
Rivers of Lewis County, Missouri
Rivers of Scotland County, Missouri
Rivers of Missouri